This is a list of governors of Tangier during the period when it was under European control.

{|class="wikitable"
Tenure
Incumbent
Notes
|-
|colspan=3|Portuguese Suzerainty
|-
|28 August 1471 to 1484?||Rodrigo Afonso de Melo, 1st Count of Olivença, Governor
|-
|1484? to 1486||Manuel de Melo, Count of Olivença, Governor
|-
|1486 to 1489||João de Meneses, 1st Count of Tarouca, Governor||1st Term
|-
|1487 to 1489||Fernão Martins Mascarenhas, Interim Governor
|-
|1489 to 1490||Manuel Pessanha, Interim Governor
|-
|1490? to 1501||Lopo Vaz de Azevedo, Governor
|-
|1501 to 1508||João de Meneses, 1st Count of Tarouca, Governor||2nd Term
|-
|1508 to 1521||Duarte de Meneses, Governor||1st Term
|-
|1521 to 1522||Henrique de Meneses, Governor
|-
|1522 to 1533||Duarte de Meneses, from Évora, Governor
|-
|1533 to 1536||Gonçalo Mendes Sacoto, Governor
|-
|1536 to 1539||Duarte de Meneses, Governor||2nd Term
|-
|1539 to 1546||João de Meneses, Governor
|-
|1546 to 1548||Francisco Botelho, Governor
|-
|1548 to 1550||Pedro de Meneses, Governor
|-
|1550 to 1552||João Álvares de Azevedo, Governor
|-
|1552 to 1553||Luís de Loureiro, Governor
|-
|1553||Fernando de Menezes, Governor
|-
|1553 to 1554||Luís da Silva de Meneses, Governor
|-
|1554 to 1564||Bernardim de Carvalho, Governor
|-
|1564 to 1566||Lourenço de Távora, Governor
|-
|15 July 1566 to 1 August 1572||João de Meneses, Governor
|-
|1572 to 1573||Rui de Carvalho, Governor
|-
|1573 to 1574||Diogo Lopes da Franca, Governor
|-
|1574 to 15 August 1574||António of Portugal, Governor
|-
|1574 to 1578||Duarte de Meneses, Viceroy of Portuguese India, Governor
|-
|1578 to September 1578||Pedro da Silva, Governor
|-
|7 September 1578 to 25 July 1581||Jorge de Mendonça, Governor
|-
|25 July 1581 to 1590||Francisco de Almeida, Governor
|-
|1590 to June 1591||Belchior da França and Simão Lopes de Mendonça, Governors
|-
|17 June 1591 to 24 August 1599||Aires de Saldanha, Governor
|-
|24 August 1599 to 22 September 1605||António Pereira Lopes de Berredo, Governor
|-
|22 September 1605 to March 1610||Nuno de Mendonça, Governor
|-
|March 1610 to June 1614||Afonso de Noronha, Governor
|-
|June 1614 to October 1614||Luís de Meneses, 2nd Count of Tarouca, Governor
|-
|October 1614 to August 1615||Luís de Noronha, Governor
|-
|August 1615 to 22 December 1616||João Coutinho, 5th Count of Redondo, Governor
|-
|22 December 1616 to 1 July 1617||André Dias da França, Governor
|-
|1 July 1617 to 1621||Pedro Manuel, Governor
|-
|1621 to 13 March 1622||André Dias da França, Governor
|-
|13 March 1622 to July 1624||Jorge de Mascarenhas, Marquis of Montalvão, Governor
|-
|July 1624 to 14 May 1628||Miguel de Noronha, 4th Count of Linhares, Governor
|-
|14 May 1628 to 18 June 1628||Galaaz Fernandes da Silveira, Governor
|-
|18 June 1628 to 1637||Fernando de Mascarenhas, Count of Torre, Governor
|-
|15 April 1637 to 24 August 1643||Rodrigo Lobo da Silveira, Governor
|-
|1643 to 16 April 1645||André Dias da França, Governor
|-
|16 April 1645 to 20 November 1649||Caetano Coutinho, Governor
|-
|20 November 1649 to January 1653||Luís Lobo, Baron of Alvito, Governor
|-
|January 1653 to 7 March 1656||Rodrigo de Lencastre, Governor
|-
|7 March 1656 to 1661||Fernando de Meneses, 2nd Count of Ericeira, Governor
|-
|1661 to 29 January 1662||Luís de Almeida, 1st Count of Avintes Governor
|-
|colspan=3|English Suzerainty (see English Tangier)
|-
|29 January 1662 to 9 May 1663||Henry Mordaunt, Earl of Peterborough, Governor
|-
|10 May 1663 1663 to 4 May 1664||Andrew Rutherford, Earl of Teviot, Governor
|-
|4 May 1664 to 1664||Sir Tobias Bridge, Acting Governor
|-
|1664 to April 1665||John Fitzgerald, Governor
|-
|April 1665 to 1666||John, Baron Belasyse, Governor (unable to take oath of conformity)
|-
|1666 to 1669||Sir Henry Norwood, Governor
|-
|1669 to 1670||John Middleton, Earl of Middleton, Governor
|-
|1670 to 1672||Sir Hugh Chomondeley, acting Governor
|-
|1672 to July 1674||John Middleton, Earl of Middleton
|-
|July 1674 to March 1675|| , acting Governor
|-
|March 1675 to 1680||William O'Brien, 2nd Earl of Inchiquin, Governor
|-
|1680 to 1680||Palmes Fairbourne, Governor
|-
|1680 to 1680||Thomas Butler, 6th Earl of Ossory, died after appointment but before taking up position
|-
|1680 to October 1680||Charles FitzCharles, 1st Earl of Plymouth, died soon after taking up position as Governor
|-
|October 1680 to 28 December 1681||Edward Sackville, Governor
|-
|28 December 1681 to 1683||Sir Percy Kirke, Governor
|-
|1683 to 6 February 1684||George Legge, Admiral Lord Dartmouth, Governor
|-
|6 February 1684||colspan="2"|Re-incorporated into Morocco
|}

See also
Timeline of Tangier
English Tangier
Tangier

 
Tangier
Tangier
Tangier
Tangier
British colonisation in Africa
Portuguese colonisation in Africa
1471 establishments
15th-century establishments in Africa
1680s disestablishments in Africa
1471 establishments in the Portuguese Empire
1661 disestablishments in the Portuguese Empire
1661 establishments in the British Empire
1684 disestablishments in the British Empire
15th century in Morocco
16th century in Morocco
17th century in Morocco